The 1981–82 Lancashire Combination was the last in the history of the Lancashire Combination, a football competition in England.

League table

External links 
 Lancashire Combination League Tables at RSSSF

1981–82 in English football leagues
Lancashire Combination